Ronny Chieng: International Student is an Australian television comedy series first screened on the ABC in 2017. The series follows the adventures of comedian Ronny Chieng as an international student, a fictionalised account of his own experiences as a law student at the University of Melbourne.

Production
The series began as part of the ABC's 2016 anthology series Comedy Showroom which consisted of six half-hour comedy TV pilots. It is directed by Jonathan Brough.

The pilot for Ronny Chieng: International Student was successful in being given the go-ahead for a full series.

Cast
 Ronny Chieng as himself
 Molly Daniels as Asher Angus
 Hoa Xuande as Elvin
 Shuang Hu as Wei-Jun
 Keith Brockett as Joderick
 Patch May as Craig Cooper
 Anthony Morgan as Professor Declan Dale
 Laurence Boxhall as Daniel
 Linda Schragger as Mrs. Chieng 
 Dave Eastgate as Mick Rosenberg

Supporting cast
 Adrienne Pickering as Karen Ford
 Quin Ellery as Nicholas
 Brenton Cosier as James
 Daniel Di Giovanni as Alexander
 Felicity Ward as Post-Grad Student

Guest cast
 Louise Siversen as Joy-Anne
 Paul Denny as Gerard
 Tim Potter as Librarian
 Gareth Yuen as Denedict
 Ryder Jack as Hipster

Broadcast and release 
Series 1 of Ronny Chieng: International Student began on ABC in Australia on 7 June 2017. 
In the US it was released on Comedy Central's app on 13 August 2018.

BBC in the UK, CBC in Canada

Comedy Central in America, Comedy Central Asia and Asia.

Series 1

References

External links
 Comedy Showroom official website
 ABC official website
 
 

2016 Australian television series debuts
2010s Australian comedy television series
2010s college television series
2010s sitcoms
Australian Broadcasting Corporation original programming
Australian television sitcoms
English-language television shows
Television shows set in Melbourne